Turisas2013 is the fourth studio album by folk metal band Turisas. It was published on August 21 in Finland, and August 26 in Europe, while the UK followed on September 2 and North America on September 3.

The album was produced by vocalist Mathias Nygård and the majority of the album recorded by Nygård and guitarist Jussi Wickström in a remote house outside of Helsinki that served as the Turisas2013 command centre and headquarters. Additional recordings were conducted in two other studios: the drums at Atomic Spa Studio and orchestral recordings at 5 by 5 Studio, both in Helsinki. Many of the vocals and numerous additional elements were tracked at Sound Supreme Studio in Hämeenlinna where Turisas also recorded The Varangian Way and Stand Up and Fight.

Track listing

References

2013 albums
Turisas albums
Century Media Records albums